Harrer is a German surname. It commonly refers to Heinrich Harrer (1912–2006), Austrian mountaineer, sportsman, geographer, and writer.

Other notable people with the surname include:

Alois Harrer (1926–2009), West German cross-country skier
Corinna Harrer (born 1991), German middle-distance runner
David Harrer (born 1990), Austrian football (soccer) midfielder
Ferenc Harrer (1874–1969), Hungarian politician, Minister of Foreign Affairs in 1919
Johann Gottlob Harrer (1703–1755), German composer
Karl Harrer (1890–1926), German journalist and politician
Martin Harrer (born 1992), Austrian football (soccer) forward
Pál Harrer (1829–1914), Hungarian councillor and politician 
Tim Harrer (born 1957), American ice hockey player
Viona Harrer (born 1986), German ice hockey player

Other uses
Harrer Building, a historic building located at 8051 North Lincoln Avenue in Skokie, Illinois

See also
 Harar, also spelled as Harrar, a walled city in eastern Ethiopia
 

German-language surnames

it:Harrer